Argentina at the 1900 Summer Olympics in Paris, France was the nation's debut appearance out of two editions of the Summer Olympic Games. Argentina did not participate in the inaugural 1896 Summer Olympics. Francisco Camet has the distinction of being Argentina's debut Olympian in the nation's debut Olympic sporting event, men's épée, placing fifth overall.

Fencing 

Francisco Camet was a single Argentine fencer in the men's épée who advanced three rounds to the final pool, where he placed 5th.

References
 De Wael, Herman. Herman's Full Olympians: "1900 Olympians from Argentina". Accessed 11 March 2006.
 

Nations at the 1900 Summer Olympics
1900
Olympics